Khanpur is a town in Jhalawar district in Rajasthan. Which is located 85 km from kota city 45 km from Baran city and 35 km from Jhalawar City.Khanpur is a tehsil headquarter.

Demographics
Khanpur's population in 2011 was 13,848 people.

Educational institutions and schools
 Government UG college
 Mother India TT college
 Great India TT college
 Government higher secondary school
 Tilak Senior Secondary School
 Maa Bharti Public sr.sec school
 Saint Sudha Sagar Public school
 Fairyland Sr.sec school
 Mount Sinai sec School
 Bachpan a play School
 Global public school

Health services
The main hospital include: 1.Government Hospital
2.AJ Manju Hospital

Economy
The town is the trade centre for an area in which Soybean, Mustard, Wheat, coriander, and oilseeds are grown. Khanpur also has some mines of stone. This stone is use in building houses. Most of the people are farmers in the rural area of Khanpur tehsil. They grow garlic, mustard, Coriander, wheat, rice, vegetables, and much more. It is also surrounded by around 200 mini-villages.

References

Cities and towns in Jhalawar district